Silvia Adriana Țicău (born 14 November 1970 in Galaţi) is a Romanian politician and Member of the European Parliament. She is a member of the Social Democratic Party, part of the Party of European Socialists, and became an MEP on 1 January 2007 with the accession of Romania to the European Union.

References

External links

European Parliament profile
European Parliament official photo

1970 births
Living people
Social Democratic Party (Romania) politicians
21st-century Romanian women politicians
People from Galați
Social Democratic Party (Romania) MEPs
MEPs for Romania 2007
MEPs for Romania 2007–2009
MEPs for Romania 2009–2014
Women MEPs for Romania
21st-century Romanian politicians